The 1936 Hörkenloppet was a Grand Prix motor race held on 16 February 1936. The race was a part of the 1936 Grand Prix season as a non-championship race. The race was won by Eugen Bjørnstad in an Alfa Romeo 8C 2300.

Results

Earlier
Bjørnstad and his Alfa also won the ice race the previous hear held in March 1935, with around 12 000 spectators. The 1500 meter track was circled 15 times, which for Bjørnstad took 16,30 minutes (average of 82 kph).  The race had Widengren on second in an Alfa Romeo, and H. Karlsson in an Amilcar in third place.

References

Horkenloppet
Auto races in Sweden